Brent Thomas Bourgeois (born June 16, 1958) is an American rock musician, songwriter, and producer. He was co-leader of the band Bourgeois Tagg with Larry Tagg, and has released several solo albums. His later work has been classified in the genres pop and contemporary Christian music.

Early life 
Born in New Orleans, Louisiana, Bourgeois grew up in New Jersey and Dallas, Texas. He moved with Tagg to California's Bay Area after high school, and in the late 1970s they played in a Sacramento band named Uncle Rainbow, which included members from Texas and other parts of the South of the United States.

Music career

Bourgeois Tagg
In 1984, Bourgeois and Tagg moved to Sacramento and formed Bourgeois Tagg with guitarist Lyle Workman, drummer Michael Urbano, and keyboardist Scott Moon. Bourgeois played keyboards, Tagg played bass, and both shared lead vocal duties.

The eponymous album Bourgeois Tagg was produced by David J. Holman and spawned two singles. "Mutual Surrender (What a Wonderful World)" performed well, if briefly, at college radio and received some dance/club play, but its follow-up "The Perfect Life" didn't fare as well. Promotional videos were produced for both singles, but received limited play. "Mutual Surrender (What a Wonderful World)" peaked at No. 62 on the Billboard Hot 100.

In 1987, Bourgeois Tagg recorded Yoyo with producer Todd Rundgren. It was released in autumn, and the band had what would prove to be their biggest hit with its first single "I Don't Mind at All", which peaked at No. 38 on the Billboard Hot 100 and No. 35 in the UK Chart. Although the single just briefly made the Top 40 in the United States, it was a Top Five hit on the Adult Contemporary chart, and a major hit worldwide. Its success was fueled by an innovative video that received heavy airplay on MTV and other music video outlets. The follow-up single "Waiting for the Worm to Turn" (the first single with a lead vocal by Tagg) failed to chart in the U.S.

Solo career
After Bourgeois Tagg split up, Bourgeois signed a solo recording deal with Virgin imprint Charisma Records. His self-titled album was released in 1990. Five songs on the album were co-produced by rock veteran Danny Kortchmar and five co-produced by David J. Holman. Brent Bourgeois featured guest appearances by Christine McVie and Rick Vito of Fleetwood Mac, and Randy Jackson, among others. The track "Can't Feel the Pain" was co-written with former bandmate Lyle Workman, who also plays guitar on that song. The album also featured a cover version of the Zombies' "Time of the Season". The first single "Dare to Fall in Love", in spite of a video that received a moderate amount of play—especially on VH1—became only a minor hit, and the album did not sell well.

1992 saw the release of A Matter of Feel. Virtually ignored by all radio and video outlets, the album fell on deaf ears and sold even less than its predecessor. The track "I'm Down with You" was co-written with Robert Palmer. Bourgeois parted ways with Charisma shortly thereafter.

In 1994 he returned with another solo album, Come Join the Living World (produced by Charlie Peacock)—this time on Reunion Records, a Contemporary Christian label—and a renewed, more literal focus on Christian themes, which he has maintained throughout his career ever since. The album spawned four No. 1 songs on Christian radio.

On June 2, 2014, Bourgeois released Don't Look Back, his first album in twenty years, and his first pop outing since A Matter of Feel. Guest artists included Julian Lennon, Todd Rundgren, and the album even served as an unofficial reunion for Bourgeois Tagg, who played on the song "Psycho."

Production and management
Between 1994 and 2002, Bourgeois worked in the contemporary Christian music world performing both songwriting and production work for acts such as Michael W. Smith, Jars of Clay, 4Him, Anointed, Jaci Velasquez, Michelle Tumes, and Cindy Morgan. He was the vice-president of A&R at Word Records in Nashville from 1997–2001, signing Nicole C. Mullen and Rachael Lampa.

Personal life
Bourgeois is married, has four children and resides in Elk Grove, California.

References

External links 
 Brent Bourgeois interview  BlogTalkRadio

1958 births
Living people
Record producers from Texas
American rock singers
American performers of Christian music
Skyline High School (Dallas) alumni
Musicians from Dallas
Musicians from New Orleans
People from Elk Grove, California
Singers from Louisiana
Record producers from California